Alvania gallinacea is a species of minute sea snail with an operculum, a marine gastropod mollusk or micromollusk in the family Rissoidae.

Distribution 
 New Zealand

Original description 
Alvania gallinacea was originally discovered and described as Linemera gallinacea by Harold John Finlay in 1930. Finlay's original text (the type description) reads as follows:

References
This article incorporates public domain text coming from New Zealand from reference.

External links 
 http://www.mollusca.co.nz/speciesdetail.php?speciesid=619&species=Alvinia%20(Linemera)%20gallinacea

Rissoidae
Gastropods described in 1930
Taxa named by Harold John Finlay